This article is about the particular significance of the year 1931 to Wales and its people.

Incumbents

Archbishop of Wales – Alfred George Edwards, Bishop of St Asaph
Archdruid of the National Eisteddfod of Wales – Pedrog

Events
3 March - Bertrand Russell succeeds to his brother's earldom.
14 April - A meteorite falls to earth on farmland in Pontllynfi, near Caernarfon.
June - Border Breweries (Wrexham) is formed by a merger.
date unknown
The Welsh School of Medicine is founded at Cardiff, later becoming the University of Wales College of Medicine.
Nancy Astor addresses a meeting in Cardiff on the subject of recruiting women into the police.

Arts and literature
Edward Tegla Davies becomes editor of Yr Efrydydd.

Awards

National Eisteddfod of Wales (held in Bangor)
National Eisteddfod of Wales: Chair - David James Jones
National Eisteddfod of Wales: Crown - Albert Evans Jones

New books

English language
Eliot Crawshay-Williams - Night in the Hotel
John Morris-Jones - Welsh Syntax: An Unfinished Draft
Bertrand Russell - The Scientific Outlook
Lily Tobias – My Mother's House

Welsh language
John Jenkins (Gwili) - Hanfod Duw a Pherson Crist
Moelona - Beryl
Jennie Thomas – Llyfr Mawr y Plant (first appearance of Wil Cwac Cwac)

Music
Grace Williams – Sextet for oboe, trumpet, violin, viola, cello and piano

Film
Ray Milland appears in The Bachelor Father, Strangers May Kiss, Just a Gigolo, Son of India, Bought, Ambassador Bill, and Blonde Crazy.
Mary Glynne appears in Inquest

Broadcasting
The BBC's Daventry radio transmitter increases its Welsh language output from a monthly to a fortnightly "Welsh interest" programme and includes a regular religious service broadcast entirely in Welsh.

Sport
Rugby union
Wales, under the captaincy of Jack Bassett, win the Five Nations Championship.
7 February Wales beat Scotland 13–8 at the Cardiff Arms Park, Cardiff.

Births
4 January - Harry Griffiths, footballer (died 1978)
10 January - Rosalind Howells, Baroness Howells of St Davids, politician
2 February - Glynn Edwards, actor (died 2018)
4 March - Gwilym Prichard, landscape painter (d. 2015)
13 March – Ted Grace, Swansea-born politician in Australia (died 2020)to 1984.
20 March - Orig Williams, wrestler and TV presenter (died 2009)
22 March - Leslie Thomas, novelist (died 2014)
30 March - Emrys Jones, literary scholar (died 2012)
7 April - Eifion Evans, church historian (died 2017)
11 April - Lewis Jones, rugby player
30 April - Merfyn Jones, footballer (died 2016)
11 May - Gerry Humphreys, sound engineer (died 2006)
29 May – Christopher Evans, computer scientist (died 1979)
23 June - Brian Sparks, Wales international rugby union player (died 2013)
29 June - Howard Morgan, cricketer
2 July - Frank Williams, actor
13 July - Philip Jones, businessman and civil servant (died 2000)
13 August 
Roy Evans, trade union leader (died 2015)
Gareth Lewis, canon of Newport (died 1997) 
15 August - Gwyn Evans, bowls player
1 September - Mair Wynn Hughes, children's author
18 September - Roger Howells, footballer (died 1975)
5 November - John Morris, Baron Morris of Aberavon, politician
17 November - Dudley Price, footballer (died 2021)
27 November - Gareth Griffiths, Wales and British Lions rugby union player
29 November - Glyn Hughes, footballer (died 1995)
25 December - Dafydd Rowlands, Eisteddfod-winning author (died 2001)
27 December - John Charles, footballer (died 2004)
30 December - John T. Houghton, climate scientist (died 2020)
date unknown - Brynley F. Roberts, scholar, librarian, National Library of Wales

Deaths
24 January - George Hay Morgan, politician, 64
28 January - Robert Henderson, cricketer, 65
30 January - Sir Garrod Thomas, physician and politician, 77
4 February - David Thomas Jones, administrator, 64
22 February - Sir Hugh Vincent, solicitor and Wales international rugby player, 68
3 March - Frank Russell, 2nd Earl Russell, 65
13 March
Vernon Hartshorn MP, miners' leader and politician
Edward Thomas John, politician, 73
14 April - John Bryn Roberts, lawyer and politician, 88
19 April - Evan Richards, Wales international rugby player, 69
12 May - Beddoe Rees, industrialist and politician
22 June - Sir Henry Reichel, academic, 74
28 July - John Neale Dalton, chaplain and tutor to the British royal family, settled in South Wales, 91
7 October - William John Griffith, author, 
26 October - Edward Perkins Alexander, Wales rugby international, 68
29 October - Edward Maes Llaned Owen, engineer, surveyor and merchant, a pioneer of Welsh colonisation in Patagonia, 85
2 November - Arthur Cook, miners' leader, 47
24 November - Jack Jones, footballer, 62
27 December - Alfred Perceval Graves, Irish author settled in Wales, 85

See also 
 1931 in Northern Ireland

References 

 
Wales